I'm Sorry (stylized as i'm sorry.) is an American sitcom television series that premiered July 12, 2017, on TruTV. On August 17, 2017, truTV renewed the series for a second season. On June 18, 2019, the series was renewed for a third season that was scheduled to return in 2020. However, on August 25, 2020, that decision was reversed when TruTV canceled the series after two seasons due to the COVID-19 pandemic.

Synopsis
The show is a situation comedy centering on writer Andrea Warren as she navigates motherhood, marriage, her career, and her social life in suburban L.A.

Cast

Main
Andrea Savage as Andrea Warren
Tom Everett Scott as Mike Harris
Olive Petrucci as Amelia Harris-Warren

Recurring
Kathy Baker as Sharon
Nelson Franklin as David
Judy Greer as Maureen
Jason Mantzoukas as Kyle
Martin Mull as Martin
Lyndon Smith as Miss Shelly
Gary Anthony Williams as Brian
Steve Zissis as Sandy
Scott Aukerman as Rob

Episodes

Season 1 (2017)

Season 2 (2019)

Reception

Critical response
The first season of I'm Sorry has received positive reviews. The review aggregation website Rotten Tomatoes reported a 75% approval rating, with an average rating based on 12 reviews. Metacritic, which uses a weighted average, assigned a score of 64 out of 100 based on 8 reviews, indicating "generally favorable reviews". The series has been often compared to that of Larry David's HBO series Curb Your Enthusiasm.

In a negative-then-somewhat-positive review, Tim Goodman from The Hollywood Reporter stated:

References

External links

 

2017 American television series debuts
2019 American television series endings
2010s American single-camera sitcoms
English-language television shows
Television shows set in Los Angeles
Television series by A24
Television series by Gloria Sanchez Productions
TruTV original programming
Television productions cancelled due to the COVID-19 pandemic